Hubert Edgar "Buddy" Bates (March 16, 1912 – April 29, 1987) was an American professional baseball player whose 18-year active career took place over a quarter century — between 1931 and 1955. All but 15 of Bates' games played occurred in the minor leagues, however. In his only trial in Major League Baseball, the outfielder spent September 1939 with the Philadelphia Phillies, where he collected 15 hits in 58 at bats; he scored eight runs.

Included among those 15 safeties was one big-league home run, struck September 29, 1939, at Shibe Park against Hal Schumacher of the New York Giants. Despite Bates' three hits in that game, the Phillies lost, 8–3 — one of 106 losses they would suffer during that season.

Born in Los Angeles, Bates batted and threw right-handed. His long minor league career was interrupted by United States Navy service during World War II. After the war, Bates became a player-manager and logged 11 seasons as a skipper, including 2 years with the Double-A Atlanta Crackers; his 1957 Crackers won the Southern Association championship. He last managed in the Baltimore Orioles' organization in 1961.

Bud Bates died in Long Beach, California, at age 75.

References

External links

1912 births
1987 deaths
Atlanta Crackers managers
Atlanta Crackers players
Baseball players from Los Angeles
Beaumont Exporters players
Burlington Bees players
Durham Bulls players
Greensboro Patriots players
Greenwood Chiefs players
Indianapolis Indians players
Lakeland Pilots players
Major League Baseball outfielders
Memphis Chickasaws players
Minor league baseball managers
Montreal Royals players
Philadelphia Phillies players
Shreveport Sports players
Toledo Mud Hens players
Toronto Maple Leafs (International League) players
Tulsa Oilers (baseball) players
Wichita Indians players
Los Angeles High School alumni